Tiahna Cochrane (born 9 July 1998) is an Australian rules footballer who played for the Carlton Football Club in the AFL Women's (AFLW). After being passed over in the national draft some days earlier, Cochrane was ultimately drafted by Carlton with the club's first selection and the fifth pick overall in the 2017 AFL Women's rookie draft. Her great uncle is Carlton team of the century player Trevor Keogh. She was delisted by Carlton at the end of the 2018 season.

References

External links 

1998 births
Living people
Carlton Football Club (AFLW) players
Australian rules footballers from Victoria (Australia)